Belloy-en-France is a commune in the Val-d'Oise department in Île-de-France in northern France. Belloy–Saint-Martin station has rail connections to Luzarches, Sarcelles and Paris.

Monuments
The Saint Georges church was built in the 13th century on the site of a primitive shrine, a very early place of pilgrimage. The façade is in Renaissance style; the gate, sometimes attributed to Jean Bullant, consists of a tympanum leading to columns grooved in Corinthian capitals, the whole surrounded by a very decorated classic entablature, surmounted in the extremities by two roof lanterns. The salamander and the initials of the king Francis I of France appear on the spandrels.

The base of the bell tower and the chapel of the Virgin Mary are the oldest parts of the building. The choir has a rib vault, strengthened by liernes in the nave and the aisles.

The stone baptismal fonts date from 1524 and are decorated with bas-reliefs representing plants. The building also has a gravestone in double effigy of Guillaume de Belloy, a pulpit and an 18th-century panellings, opposite a 17th-century banc d'œuvre  surmounted by a pediment.

Belloy-en-France is the location of the only remaining French manufacturer of traditional tassels, Les Passementeries de l'île de France, .

See also
Communes of the Val-d'Oise department

References

External links

Association of Mayors of the Val d'Oise 

Communes of Val-d'Oise